The Oxford School is a school in Thiruvananthapuram, Kerala, India, run by the Manarul Huda Trust, a charitable trust registered in India. The school was built in 2005, and is one of four schools under the same trust. The school follows the CBSE syllabus. There are about 1300 students from Kindergarten to Higher Secondary. Its one of the few schools in Kerala offering EYFS for preschool students.

Major Events

OXPO
The school organizes an annual Science Exhibitions named OXPO, in which all students from the school take part in. Student from different clubs devote themselves to creating presentations. Judges are called and prizes distributed from the special guest.

Oxford Badminton Tournament
During summer holidays, the school host 'Oxford Badminton Tournament' in association with Trivandrum District Badminton (Shuttle) Association. Events are scheduled under 7 categories
 Under 11 Boys Singles
 Under 13 Boys Singles
 Under 13 Boys Doubles
 Under 15 Boys Singles
 Under 15 Boys Doubles
 Under 17 Boys Singles
 Under 17 Boys Doubles

Cash prize and ever rolling trophies are presented to the winners

Activities
Students from class three to eight take part in extra-curricular activities such as sports, yoga, swimming, and arts classes from 2:30 to 2:55pm every afternoon. Extra classes are also held to further any student's special interests like Swimming, Yoga etc.

Nurturing personal, creative and physical development of students
Literary clubs
Cultural programs
Sports
Leadership opportunities
Music & Drama

The School offers these facilities before school, during lunch hours, and after school. Every student is encouraged to participate in activities and to choose wisely so that they can participate fully in what they have chosen.

References

External links

 [THE OXFORD SCHOOL TRIVANDRUM/ https://www.oxfordtvm.com/]
 Official website
 News from The Hindu

International schools in Thiruvananthapuram
Private schools in Thiruvananthapuram